Sonia Maria Sotomayor  (born June 25, 1954) is an American lawyer and jurist who serves as an associate justice of the Supreme Court of the United States. She was nominated by President Barack Obama on May 26, 2009, and has served since August 8, 2009. She is the third woman, first woman of color, the first Hispanic, and first Latina to serve on the Supreme Court.

Sotomayor was born in the Bronx, New York City, to Puerto Rican-born parents. Her father died when she was nine, and she was subsequently raised by her mother. Sotomayor graduated summa cum laude from Princeton University in 1976 and received her Juris Doctor from Yale Law School in 1979, where she was an editor at the Yale Law Journal. She worked as an assistant district attorney in New York for four and a half years before entering private practice in 1984. She played an active role on the boards of directors for the Puerto Rican Legal Defense and Education Fund, the State of New York Mortgage Agency, and the New York City Campaign Finance Board.

Sotomayor was nominated to the U.S. District Court for the Southern District of New York by President George H. W. Bush in 1991; confirmation followed in 1992. In 1997, she was nominated by President Bill Clinton to the U.S. Court of Appeals for the Second Circuit. Her nomination was slowed by the Republican majority in the United States Senate, but she was eventually confirmed in 1998. On the Second Circuit, Sotomayor heard appeals in more than 3,000 cases and wrote about 380 opinions. Sotomayor has taught at the New York University School of Law and Columbia Law School.

In May 2009, President Barack Obama nominated Sotomayor to the Supreme Court following the retirement of Justice David Souter. Her nomination was confirmed by the Senate in August 2009 by a vote of 68–31. While on the Court, Sotomayor has supported the informal liberal bloc of justices when they divide along the commonly perceived ideological lines. During her Supreme Court tenure, Sotomayor has been identified with concern for the rights of defendants and criminal justice reform, and is known for her impassioned dissents on issues of race, ethnic, and gender identity, including Schuette v. BAMN, Utah v. Strieff, and Trump v. Hawaii.

Early life

Sotomayor was born in the New York City borough of the Bronx. Her father was Juan Sotomayor (c. 1921–1964), from the area of Santurce, San Juan, Puerto Rico, and her mother was Celina Báez (1927–2021), an orphan from Santa Rosa in Lajas, a rural area on Puerto Rico's southwest coast.

The two left Puerto Rico separately, met, and married during World War II after Celina served in the Women's Army Corps. Juan Sotomayor had a third-grade education, did not speak English, and worked as a tool and die worker; Celina Baez worked as a telephone operator and then a practical nurse. Sonia's younger brother, Juan Sotomayor (born c. 1957), later became a physician and university professor in the Syracuse, New York, area.

Sotomayor was raised a Catholic and grew up in Puerto Rican communities in the South Bronx and East Bronx; she self-identifies as a "Nuyorican".  The family lived in a South Bronx tenement  before moving in 1957 to the well-maintained, racially and ethnically mixed, working-class Bronxdale Houses housing project in Soundview (which has over time been thought as part of both the East Bronx and South Bronx). In 2010, the Bronxdale Houses were renamed in her honor. Her relative proximity to Yankee Stadium led to her becoming a lifelong fan of the New York Yankees.  The extended family got together frequently and regularly visited Puerto Rico during summers.

Sonia grew up with an alcoholic father and a mother who was emotionally distant; she felt closest to her grandmother, who she later said gave her a source of "protection and purpose".
Sonia was diagnosed with type 1 diabetes at age seven, and began taking daily insulin injections. Her father died of heart problems at age 42, when she was nine years old. After this, she became fluent in English. Sotomayor has said that she was first inspired by the strong-willed Nancy Drew book character, and then after her diabetes diagnosis led doctors to suggest a different career from detective, she was inspired to go into a legal career and become a judge by watching the Perry Mason television series.  She reflected in 1998: "I was going to college and I was going to become an attorney, and I knew that when I was ten. Ten. That's no jest."

Celina Sotomayor put great stress on the value of education; she bought the Encyclopædia Britannica for her children, something unusual in the housing projects. Despite the distance between the two, which became greater after her father's death and which was not fully reconciled until decades later, Sotomayor has credited her mother with being her "life inspiration". For grammar school, Sotomayor attended Blessed Sacrament School in Soundview, where she was valedictorian and had a near-perfect attendance record. Although underage, Sotomayor worked at a local retail store and a hospital. Sotomayor passed the entrance tests for and then attended Cardinal Spellman High School in the Bronx. At Cardinal Spellman, Sotomayor was on the forensics team and was elected to the student government. She graduated as valedictorian in 1972.  Meanwhile, the Bronxdale Houses had fallen victim to increasing heroin use, crime, and the emergence of the Black Spades gang.  In 1970, the family found refuge by moving to Co-op City in the Northeast Bronx.

College and law school
Sotomayor attended Princeton University. She has said she was admitted in part due to her achievements in high school and in part because affirmative action made up for her standardized test scores, which she described as "not comparable to her colleagues at Princeton and Yale."  She would later say that there are cultural biases built into such testing and praise affirmative action for fulfilling "its purpose: to create the conditions whereby students from disadvantaged backgrounds could be brought to the starting line of a race many were unaware was even being run."

Sotomayor described her time at Princeton as life-changing. Initially, she felt like "a visitor landing in an alien country" coming from the Bronx and Puerto Rico. Princeton had few women students and fewer Latinos (about 20). She was too intimidated to ask questions during her freshman year; her writing and vocabulary skills were weak, and she lacked knowledge in the classics. She put in long hours in the library and over summers, worked with a professor outside of class, and gained skills, knowledge, and confidence. She became a moderate student activist and co-chair of the Acción Puertorriqueña organization, which served as a social and political hub and sought more opportunities for Puerto Rican students. She worked in the admissions office, traveling to high schools and lobbying on behalf of her best prospects.

As a student activist, Sotomayor focused on faculty hiring and curriculum, since Princeton did not have a single full-time Latino professor nor any class on Latin American studies.  A meeting with university president William G. Bowen in her sophomore year saw no results, leading to Sotomayor's saying in a New York Times story at the time that "Princeton is following a policy of benign neutrality and is not making substantive efforts to change." Acción Puertorriqueña filed a formal letter of complaint in April 1974 with the Department of Health, Education and Welfare, saying the school discriminated in its hiring and admission practices. Sotomayor wrote opinion pieces for the Daily Princetonian with the same theme. The university began to hire Latino faculty, and Sotomayor established an ongoing dialogue with Bowen.  Sotomayor also successfully persuaded historian Peter Winn to create a seminar on Puerto Rican history and politics. Sotomayor joined the governance board of Princeton's Third World Center and served on the university's student–faculty Discipline Committee, which issued rulings on student infractions. She also ran an after-school program for local children and volunteered as an interpreter for Latino patients at Trenton Psychiatric Hospital.

Academically, Sotomayor stumbled her first year at Princeton, but later received almost all A's in her final two years of college. Sotomayor wrote her senior thesis on Luis Muñoz Marín, the first democratically elected governor of Puerto Rico, and on the territory's struggles for economic and political self-determination. The 178-page work, "La Historia Ciclica de Puerto Rico: The Impact of the Life of Luis Muñoz Marin on the Political and Economic History of Puerto Rico, 1930–1975", won honorable mention for the Latin American Studies Thesis Prize. As a senior, Sotomayor won the Pyne Prize, the top award for undergraduates, which reflected both strong grades and extracurricular activities. In 1976, she was elected to Phi Beta Kappa and graduated summa cum laude with an A.B. in history. She was influenced by critical race theory, which would be reflected in her later speeches and writings.

On August 14, 1976, just after graduating from Princeton, Sotomayor married Kevin Edward Noonan, whom she had dated since high school, in a small chapel at St. Patrick's Cathedral in New York. She used the married name Sonia Sotomayor de Noonan. He became a biologist and a patent lawyer.

Sotomayor entered Yale Law School in the fall of 1976. While she believes she again benefited from affirmative action to compensate for relatively low standardized test scores, a former dean of admissions at Yale has said that given her record at Princeton, it probably had little effect. At Yale she fit in well although she found there were again few Latino students. She was known as a hard worker but she was not considered among the star students in her class. Yale General Counsel and professor José A. Cabranes acted as an early mentor to her to successfully transition and work within "the system".  She became an editor of the Yale Law Journal and was also managing editor of the student-run Yale Studies in World Public Order publication (later known as the Yale Journal of International Law).  Sotomayor published a law review note on the effect of possible Puerto Rican statehood on the island's mineral and ocean rights. She was a semi-finalist in the Barristers Union mock trial competition. She served as the co-chair of a group for Latin, Asian, and Native American students, and continued to advocate for the hiring of more Hispanic faculty.

Following her second year, she gained a job as a summer associate with the prominent New York law firm Paul, Weiss, Rifkind, Wharton & Garrison. By her own later evaluation, her performance there was lacking. She did not receive an offer for a full-time position, an experience that she later described as a "kick in the teeth" and one that would bother her for years. In her third year, she filed a formal complaint against the established Washington, D.C., law firm of Shaw, Pittman, Potts & Trowbridge for suggesting during a recruiting dinner that she was at Yale only via affirmative action. Sotomayor refused to be interviewed by the firm further and filed her complaint with a faculty–student tribunal, which ruled in her favor. Her action triggered a campus-wide debate, and news of the firm's subsequent December 1978 apology made The Washington Post.

In 1979, Sotomayor was awarded a Juris Doctor from Yale Law School. She was admitted to the New York Bar the following year.

Early legal career
On the recommendation of Cabranes, Sotomayor was hired out of law school as an assistant district attorney under New York County District Attorney Robert Morgenthau starting in 1979.  She said at the time that she did so with conflicted emotions: "There was a tremendous amount of pressure from my community, from the third world community, at Yale. They could not understand why I was taking this job. I'm not sure I've ever resolved that problem."  It was a time of crisis-level crime rates and drug problems in New York, Morgenthau's staff was overburdened with cases, and like other rookie prosecutors, Sotomayor was initially fearful of appearing before judges in court. Working in the trial division, she handled heavy caseloads as she prosecuted everything from shoplifting and prostitution to robberies, assaults, and murders. She also worked on cases involving police brutality. She was not afraid to venture into tough neighborhoods or endure squalid conditions in order to interview witnesses. In the courtroom, she was effective at cross examination and at simplifying a case in ways to which a jury could relate. In 1983, she helped convict Richard Maddicks (known as the "Tarzan Murderer" who acrobatically entered apartments, robbed them, and shot residents for no reason). She felt lower-level crimes were largely products of socioeconomic environment and poverty, but she had a different attitude about serious felonies: "No matter how liberal I am, I'm still outraged by crimes of violence. Regardless of whether I can sympathize with the causes that lead these individuals to do these crimes, the effects are outrageous." Hispanic-on-Hispanic crime was of particular concern to her: "The saddest crimes for me were the ones that my own people committed against each other." In general, she showed a passion for bringing law and order to the streets of New York, displaying special zeal in pursuing child pornography cases, unusual for the time. She worked 15-hour days and gained a reputation for being driven and for her preparedness and fairness. One of her job evaluations labelled her a "potential superstar". Morgenthau later described her as "smart, hard-working, [and having] a lot of common sense," and as a "fearless and effective prosecutor." She stayed a typical length of time in the post and had a common reaction to the job: "After a while, you forget there are decent, law-abiding people in life."

Sotomayor and Noonan divorced amicably in 1983; they did not have children. She has said that the pressures of her working life were a contributing factor, but not the major factor, in the breakup. From 1983 to 1986, Sotomayor had an informal solo practice, dubbed Sotomayor & Associates, located in her Brooklyn apartment. She performed legal consulting work, often for friends or family members.

In 1984, she entered private practice, joining the commercial litigation practice group of Pavia & Harcourt in Manhattan as an associate. One of 30 attorneys in the law firm, she specialized in intellectual property litigation, international law, and arbitration. She later said, "I wanted to complete myself as an attorney." Although she had no civil litigation experience, the firm recruited her heavily, and she learned quickly on the job. She was eager to try cases and argue in court, rather than be part of a larger law firm. Her clients were mostly international corporations doing business in the United States; much of her time was spent tracking down and suing counterfeiters of Fendi goods. In some cases, Sotomayor went on-site with the police to Harlem or Chinatown to have illegitimate merchandise seized, in the latter instance pursuing a fleeing culprit while riding on a motorcycle. She said at the time that Pavia & Harcourt's efforts were run "much like a drug operation", and the successful rounding up of thousands of counterfeit accessories in 1986 was celebrated by "Fendi Crush", a destruction-by-garbage-truck event at Tavern on the Green. At other times, she dealt with dry legal issues such as grain export contract disputes. In a 1986 appearance on Good Morning America that profiled women ten years after college graduation, she said that the bulk of law work was drudgery, and that while she was content with her life, she had expected greater things of herself coming out of college.  In 1988 she became a partner at the firm; she was paid well but not extravagantly. She left in 1992 when she became a judge.

In addition to her law firm work, Sotomayor found visible public service roles. She was not connected to the party bosses that typically picked people for such jobs in New York, and indeed she was registered as an independent. Instead, District Attorney Morgenthau, an influential figure, served as her patron. In 1987, Governor of New York Mario Cuomo appointed Sotomayor to the board of the State of New York Mortgage Agency, which she served on until 1992. As part of one of the largest urban rebuilding efforts in American history, the agency helped low-income people get home mortgages and to provide insurance coverage for housing and hospices for sufferers of AIDS. Despite being the youngest member of a board composed of strong personalities, she involved herself in the details of the operation and was effective. She was vocal in supporting the right to affordable housing, directing more funds to lower-income home owners, and in her skepticism about the effects of gentrification, although in the end she voted in favor of most of the projects.

Sotomayor was appointed by Mayor Ed Koch in 1988 as one of the founding members of the New York City Campaign Finance Board, where she served for four years. There she took a vigorous role in the board's implementation of a voluntary scheme wherein local candidates received public matching funds in exchange for limits on contributions and spending and agreeing to greater financial disclosure. Sotomayor showed no patience with candidates who failed to follow regulations and was more of a stickler for making campaigns follow those regulations than some of the other board members. She joined in rulings that fined, audited, or reprimanded the mayoral campaigns of Koch, David Dinkins, and Rudy Giuliani.

Based upon another recommendation from Cabranes, Sotomayor was a member of the board of directors of the Puerto Rican Legal Defense and Education Fund from 1980 to 1992. There she was a top policy maker who worked actively with the organization's lawyers on issues such as New York City hiring practices, police brutality, the death penalty, and voting rights. The group achieved its most visible triumph when it successfully blocked a city primary election on the grounds that New York City Council boundaries diminished the power of minority voters.

During 1985 and 1986, Sotomayor served on the board of the Maternity Center Association, a Manhattan-based non-profit group which focused on improving the quality of maternity care.

Federal district judge

Nomination and confirmation
Sotomayor had wanted to become a judge since she was in elementary school, and in 1991 she was recommended for a spot by Democratic New York senator Daniel Patrick Moynihan. Moynihan had an unusual bipartisan arrangement with his fellow New York senator, Republican Al D'Amato, whereby he would get to choose roughly one out of every four New York district court seats even though a Republican was in the White House. Moynihan also wanted to fulfill a public promise he had made to get a Hispanic judge appointed for New York. When Moynihan's staff recommended her to him, they said "Have we got a judge for you!" Moynihan identified with her socio-economic and academic background and became convinced she would become the first Hispanic Supreme Court justice. D'Amato became an enthusiastic backer of Sotomayor, who was seen as politically centrist at the time. Of the impending drop in salary from private practice, Sotomayor said: "I've never wanted to get adjusted to my income because I knew I wanted to go back to public service. And in comparison to what my mother earns and how I was raised, it's not modest at all."

Sotomayor was thus nominated on November 27, 1991, by President George H. W. Bush to a seat on the U.S. District Court for the Southern District of New York vacated by John M. Walker Jr. Senate Judiciary Committee hearings, led by a friendly Democratic majority, went smoothly for her in June 1992, with her pro bono activities winning praise from Senator Ted Kennedy and her getting unanimous approval from the committee. Then a Republican senator blocked her nomination and that of three others for a while in retaliation for an unrelated block Democrats had put on another nominee. D'Amato objected strongly; some weeks later, the block was dropped, and Sotomayor was confirmed by unanimous consent of the full United States Senate on August 11, 1992, and received her commission the next day.

Sotomayor became the youngest judge in the Southern District and the first Hispanic federal judge in New York State. She became the first Puerto Rican woman to serve as a judge in a U.S. federal court. She was one of seven women among the district's 58 judges.  She moved from Carroll Gardens, Brooklyn, back to the Bronx in order to live within her district.

Judgeship
Sotomayor generally kept a low public profile as a district court judge. She showed a willingness to take anti-government positions in a number of cases, and during her first year in the seat, she received high ratings from liberal public-interest groups. Other sources and organizations regarded her as a centrist during this period. In criminal cases, she gained a reputation for tough sentencing and was not viewed as a pro-defense judge.  A Syracuse University study found that in such cases, Sotomayor generally handed out longer sentences than her colleagues, especially when white-collar crime was involved.  Fellow district judge Miriam Goldman Cedarbaum was an influence on Sotomayor in adopting a narrow, "just the facts" approach to judicial decision-making.

As a trial judge, she garnered a reputation for being well-prepared in advance of a case and moving cases along a tight schedule. Lawyers before her court viewed her as plain-spoken, intelligent, demanding, and sometimes somewhat unforgiving; one said, "She does not have much patience for people trying to snow her. You can't do it."

Notable rulings
On March 30, 1995, in Silverman v. Major League Baseball Player Relations Committee, Inc., Sotomayor issued a preliminary injunction against Major League Baseball, preventing it from unilaterally implementing a new collective bargaining agreement and using replacement players. Her ruling ended the 1994 baseball strike after 232 days, the day before the new season was scheduled to begin. The Second Circuit upheld Sotomayor's decision and denied the owners' request to stay the ruling.  The decision raised her profile, won her the plaudits of baseball fans, and had a lasting effect on the game. In the preparatory phase of the case, Sotomayor informed the lawyers of both sides that, "I hope none of you assumed ... that my lack of knowledge of any of the intimate details of your dispute meant I was not a baseball fan. You can't grow up in the South Bronx without knowing about baseball."

In Dow Jones v. Department of Justice (1995), Sotomayor sided with the Wall Street Journal in its efforts to obtain and publish a photocopy of the last note left by former Deputy White House Counsel Vince Foster. Sotomayor ruled that the public had "a substantial interest" in viewing the note and enjoined the U.S. Justice Department from blocking its release.

In New York Times Co. v. Tasini (1997), freelance journalists sued the New York Times Company for copyright infringement for The New York Times inclusion in an electronic archival database (LexisNexis) of the work of freelancers it had published. Sotomayor ruled that the publisher had the right to license the freelancers' work. This decision was reversed on appeal, and the Supreme Court upheld the reversal; two dissenters (John Paul Stevens and Stephen Breyer) took Sotomayor's position.

In Castle Rock Entertainment, Inc. v. Carol Publishing Group (also in 1997), Sotomayor ruled that a book of trivia from the television program Seinfeld infringed on the copyright of the show's producer and did not constitute legal fair use. The United States Court of Appeals for the Second Circuit upheld Sotomayor's ruling.

Court of Appeals judge

Nomination and confirmation

On June 25, 1997, Sotomayor was nominated by President Bill Clinton to a seat on the U.S. Court of Appeals for the Second Circuit, which was vacated by J. Daniel Mahoney. Her nomination was initially expected to have smooth sailing, with the American Bar Association Standing Committee on the Federal Judiciary giving her a "well qualified" professional assessment. However, as The New York Times described, "[it became] embroiled in the sometimes tortured judicial politics of the Senate." Some in the Republican majority believed Clinton was eager to name the first Hispanic Supreme Court justice and that an easy confirmation to the appeals court would put Sotomayor in a better position for a possible Supreme Court nomination (despite there being no vacancy at the time nor any indication the Clinton administration was considering nominating her or any Hispanic). Therefore, the Republican majority decided to slow her confirmation. Radio commentator Rush Limbaugh weighed in that Sotomayor was an ultraliberal who was on a "rocket ship" to the highest court.

During her September 1997 hearing before the Senate Judiciary Committee, Sotomayor parried strong questioning from some Republican members about mandatory sentencing, gay rights, and her level of respect for Supreme Court Justice Clarence Thomas. After a long wait, she was approved by the committee in March 1998, with only two dissensions. However, in June 1998, the influential Wall Street Journal editorial page opined that the Clinton administration intended to "get her on to the Second Circuit, then elevate her to the Supreme Court as soon as an opening occurs"; the editorial criticized two of her district court rulings and urged further delay of her confirmation.  The Republican block continued.

Ranking Democratic committee member Patrick Leahy objected to Republican use of a secret hold to slow down the Sotomayor nomination, and Leahy attributed that anonymous tactic to GOP reticence about publicly opposing a female Hispanic nominee. The prior month, Leahy had triggered a procedural delay in the confirmation of fellow Second Circuit nominee Chester J. Straub—who, although advanced by Clinton and supported by Senator Moynihan, was considered much more acceptable by Republicans—in an unsuccessful effort to force earlier consideration of the Sotomayor confirmation.

During 1998, several Hispanic organizations organized a petition drive in New York State, generating hundreds of signatures from New Yorkers to try to convince New York Republican senator Al D'Amato to push the Senate leadership to bring Sotomayor's nomination to a vote. D'Amato, a backer of Sotomayor to begin with and additionally concerned about being up for re-election that year, helped move Republican leadership. Her nomination had been pending for over a year when Majority Leader Trent Lott scheduled the vote. With complete Democratic support, and support from 25 Republican senators including Judiciary chair Orrin Hatch, Sotomayor was confirmed on October 2, 1998, by a 67–29 vote. She received her commission on October 7.  The confirmation experience left Sotomayor somewhat angry; she said shortly afterwards that during the hearings, Republicans had assumed her political beliefs based on her being a Latina: "That series of questions, I think, were symbolic of a set of expectations that some people had [that] I must be liberal. It is stereotyping, and stereotyping is perhaps the most insidious of all problems in our society today."

Judgeship
Over her ten years on the Second Circuit, Sotomayor heard appeals in more than 3,000 cases and wrote about 380 opinions when she was in the majority. The Supreme Court reviewed five of those, reversing three and affirming two—not high numbers for an appellate judge of that many years and a typical percentage of reversals.

Sotomayor's circuit court rulings led to her being considered a political centrist by the ABA Journal and other sources and organizations. Several lawyers, legal experts, and news organizations identified her as someone with liberal inclinations. In any case, the Second Circuit's caseload typically skewed more toward business and securities law rather than hot-button social or constitutional issues. Sotomayor tended to write narrow, practiced rulings that relied on close application of the law to the facts of a case rather than import general philosophical viewpoints. A Congressional Research Service analysis found that Sotomayor's rulings defied easy ideological categorization, but did show an adherence to precedent and an avoidance of overstepping the circuit court's judicial role. Unusually, Sotomayor read through all the supporting documents of cases under review; her lengthy rulings explored every aspect of a case and tended to feature leaden, ungainly prose. Some legal experts have said that Sotomayor's attention to detail and re-examination of the facts of a case came close to overstepping the traditional role of appellate judges.

Across some 150 cases involving business and civil law, Sotomayor's rulings were generally unpredictable and not consistently pro-business or anti-business.  Sotomayor's influence in the federal judiciary, as measured by the number of citations of her rulings by other judges and in law review articles, increased significantly during the length of her appellate judgeship and was greater than that of some other prominent federal appeals court judges. Two academic studies showed that the percentage of Sotomayor's decisions that overrode policy decisions by elected branches was the same as or lower than that of other circuit judges.

Sotomayor was a member of the Second Circuit Task Force on Gender, Racial and Ethnic Fairness in the Courts. In October 2001, she presented the annual Judge Mario G. Olmos Memorial Lecture at UC Berkeley School of Law; titled "A Latina Judge's Voice"; it was published in the Berkeley La Raza Law Journal the following spring.  In the speech, she discussed the characteristics of her Latina upbringing and culture and the history of minorities and women ascending to the federal bench.  She said the low number of minority women on the federal bench at that time was "shocking". She then discussed at length how her own experiences as a Latina might affect her decisions as a judge.  In any case, her background in activism did not necessarily influence her rulings: in a study of 50 racial discrimination cases brought before her panel, 45 were rejected, with Sotomayor never filing a dissent. An expanded study showed that Sotomayor decided 97 cases involving a claim of discrimination and rejected those claims nearly 90 percent of the time.  Another examination of Second Circuit split decisions on cases that dealt with race and discrimination showed no clear ideological pattern in Sotomayor's opinions.

In the Court of Appeals seat, Sotomayor gained a reputation for vigorous and blunt behavior toward lawyers appealing before her, sometimes to the point of brusque and curt treatment or testy interruptions.  She was known for extensive preparation for oral arguments and for running a "hot bench", where judges ask lawyers plenty of questions. Unprepared lawyers suffered the consequences, but the vigorous questioning was an aid to lawyers seeking to tailor their arguments to the judge's concerns. The 2009 Almanac of the Federal Judiciary, which collected anonymous evaluations of judges by lawyers who appear before them, contained a wide range of reactions to Sotomayor. Comments also diverged among lawyers willing to be named. Attorney Sheema Chaudhry said, "She's brilliant and she's qualified, but I just feel that she can be very, how do you say, temperamental." Defense lawyer Gerald B. Lefcourt said, "She used her questioning to make a point, as opposed to really looking for an answer to a question she did not understand." In contrast, Second Circuit Judge Richard C. Wesley said that his interactions with Sotomayor had been "totally antithetical to this perception that has gotten some traction that she is somehow confrontational." Second Circuit Judge and former teacher Guido Calabresi said his tracking showed that Sotomayor's questioning patterns were no different from those of other members of the court and added, "Some lawyers just don't like to be questioned by a woman. [The criticism] was sexist, plain and simple."
Sotomayor's law clerks regarded her as a valuable and strong mentor, and she said that she viewed them like family.

In 2005, Senate Democrats suggested Sotomayor, among others, to President George W. Bush as an acceptable nominee to fill the seat of retiring Supreme Court Justice Sandra Day O'Connor.

Notable rulings

Abortion
In the 2002 decision Center for Reproductive Law and Policy v. Bush, Sotomayor upheld the Bush administration's implementation of the Mexico City Policy, which states that "the United States will no longer contribute to separate nongovernmental organizations which perform or actively promote abortion as a method of family planning in other nations." Sotomayor held that the policy did not constitute a violation of equal protection, as "the government is free to favor the anti-abortion position over the pro-choice position, and can do so with public funds."

First Amendment rights
In Pappas v. Giuliani (2002), Sotomayor dissented from her colleagues' ruling that the New York Police Department could terminate from his desk job an employee who sent racist materials through the mail. Sotomayor argued that the First Amendment protected speech by the employee "away from the office, on [his] own time", even if that speech was "offensive, hateful, and insulting", and that therefore the employee's First Amendment claim should have gone to trial rather than being dismissed on summary judgment.

In 2005, Sotomayor wrote the opinion for United States v. Quattrone. Frank Quattrone had been on trial on charges of obstructing investigations related to technology IPOs. After the first trial ended in a deadlocked jury and a mistrial, some members of the media had wanted to publish the names of the jurors deciding Quattrone's case, and a district court had issued an order barring the publication, even though their names had previously been disclosed in open court. In United States v. Quattrone, Sotomayor wrote the opinion for the Second Circuit panel striking down this order on First Amendment grounds, stating that the media should be free to publish the names of the jurors. Sotomayor held that although it was important to protect the fairness of the retrial, the district court's order was an unconstitutional prior restraint on free speech and violated the right of the press "to report freely on events that transpire in an open courtroom".

In 2008, Sotomayor was on a three-judge panel in Doninger v. Niehoff that unanimously affirmed, in an opinion written by Second Circuit Judge Debra Livingston, the district court's judgment that Lewis S. Mills High School did not violate the First Amendment rights of a student when it barred her from running for student government after she called the superintendent and other school officials "douchebags" in a blog post written while off-campus that encouraged students to call an administrator and "piss her off more". Judge Livingston held that the district judge did not abuse her discretion in holding that the student's speech "foreseeably create[d] a risk of substantial disruption within the school environment", which is the precedent in the Second Circuit for when schools may regulate off-campus speech.  Although Sotomayor did not write this opinion, she has been criticized by some who disagree with it.

Second Amendment rights
Sotomayor was part of the three-judge Second Circuit panel that affirmed the district court's ruling in Maloney v. Cuomo (2009).  Maloney was arrested for possession of nunchucks, which are illegal in New York; Maloney argued that this law violated his Second Amendment right to bear arms. The Second Circuit's per curiam opinion noted that the Supreme Court has not, so far, ever held that the Second Amendment is binding against state governments. On the contrary, in Presser v. Illinois (1886), the Supreme Court held that the Second Amendment "is a limitation only upon the power of Congress and the national government, and not upon that of the state". With respect to the Presser v. Illinois precedent, the panel stated that only the Supreme Court has "the prerogative of overruling its own decisions," and the recent Supreme Court case of District of Columbia v. Heller (which struck down the District's gun ban as unconstitutional) did "not invalidate this longstanding principle". The panel upheld the lower court's decision dismissing Maloney's challenge to New York's law against possession of nunchucks.  On June 2, 2009, a Seventh Circuit panel, including the prominent and heavily cited judges Richard Posner and Frank Easterbrook, unanimously agreed with Maloney v. Cuomo, citing the case in their decision turning back a challenge to Chicago's gun laws and noting the Supreme Court precedents remain in force until altered by the Supreme Court itself.

Fourth Amendment rights
In N.G. & S.G. ex rel. S.C. v. Connecticut (2004), Sotomayor dissented from her colleagues' decision to uphold a series of strip searches of "troubled adolescent girls" in juvenile detention centers. While Sotomayor agreed that some of the strip searches at issue in the case were lawful, she would have held that due to "the severely intrusive nature of strip searches", they should not be allowed "in the absence of individualized suspicion, of adolescents who have never been charged with a crime". She argued that an "individualized suspicion" rule was more consistent with Second Circuit precedent than the majority's rule.

In Leventhal v. Knapek (2001), Sotomayor rejected a Fourth Amendment challenge by a U.S. Department of Transportation employee whose employer searched his office computer. She held that, "Even though [the employee] had some expectation of privacy in the contents of his office computer, the investigatory searches by the DOT did not violate his Fourth Amendment rights" because here "there were reasonable grounds to believe" that the search would reveal evidence of "work-related misconduct".

Alcohol in commerce
In 2004, Sotomayor was part of the judge panel that ruled in Swedenburg v. Kelly that New York's law prohibiting out-of-state wineries from shipping directly to consumers in New York was constitutional even though in-state wineries were allowed to. The case, which invoked the 21st Amendment, was appealed and attached to another case. The case reached the Supreme Court later on as Swedenburg v. Kelly and was overruled in a 5–4 decision that found the law was discriminatory and unconstitutional.

Employment discrimination
Sotomayor was involved in the high-profile case Ricci v. DeStefano  that initially upheld the right of the City of New Haven to throw out its test for firefighters and start over with a new test, because the City believed the test had a "disparate impact" on minority firefighters. (No black firefighters qualified for promotion under the test, whereas some had qualified under tests used in previous years.) The City was concerned that minority firefighters might sue under Title VII of the Civil Rights Act of 1964. The City chose not to certify the test results and a lower court had previously upheld the City's right to do this. Several white firefighters and one Hispanic firefighter who had passed the test, including the lead plaintiff who has dyslexia and had put extra effort into studying, sued the City of New Haven, claiming that their rights were violated. A Second Circuit panel that included Sotomayor first issued a brief, unsigned summary order (not written by Sotomayor) affirming the lower court's ruling. Sotomayor's former mentor José A. Cabranes, by now a fellow judge on the court, objected to this handling and requested that the court hear it en banc. Sotomayor voted with a 7–6 majority not to rehear it and a slightly expanded ruling was issued, but a strong dissent by Cabranes led to the case reaching the Supreme Court in 2009.  There it was overruled in a 5–4 decision that found the white firefighters had been victims of racial discrimination when they were denied promotion.

Business
In Clarett v. National Football League (2004), Sotomayor upheld the National Football League's eligibility rules requiring players to wait three full seasons after high school graduation before entering the NFL draft. Maurice Clarett challenged these rules, which were part of the collective bargaining agreement between the NFL and its players, on antitrust grounds. Sotomayor held that Clarett's claim would upset the established "federal labor law favoring and governing the collective bargaining process".

In Merrill Lynch, Pierce, Fenner & Smith, Inc. v. Dabit (2005), Sotomayor wrote a unanimous opinion that the Securities Litigation Uniform Standards Act of 1998 did not preempt class action claims in state courts by stockbrokers alleging misleading inducement to buy or sell stocks. The Supreme Court handed down an 8–0 decision stating that the Act did preempt such claims, thereby overruling Sotomayor's decision.

In Specht v. Netscape Communications Corp. (2001), she ruled that the license agreement of Netscape's Smart Download software did not constitute a binding contract because the system did not give "sufficient notice" to the user.

Civil rights
In Correctional Services Corp. v. Malesko (2000), Sotomayor, writing for the court, supported the right of an individual to sue a private corporation working on behalf of the federal government for alleged violations of that individual's constitutional rights. Reversing a lower court decision, Sotomayor found that the Bivens doctrine—which allows suits against individuals working for the federal government for constitutional rights violations—could be applied to the case of a former prisoner seeking to sue the private company operating the federal halfway house facility in which he resided. The Supreme Court reversed Sotomayor's ruling in a 5–4 decision, saying that the Bivens doctrine could not be expanded to cover private entities working on behalf of the federal government. Justices Stevens, Souter, Ginsburg, and Breyer dissented, siding with Sotomayor's original ruling.

In Gant v. Wallingford Board of Education (1999), the parents of a black student alleged that he had been harassed due to his race and had been discriminated against when he was transferred from a first grade class to a kindergarten class without parental consent, while similarly situated white students were treated differently. Sotomayor agreed with the dismissal of the harassment claims due to lack of evidence, but would have allowed the discrimination claim to go forward. She wrote in dissent that the grade transfer was "contrary to the school's established policies" as well as its treatment of white students, which "supports the inference that race discrimination played a role".

Property rights
In Krimstock v. Kelly (2002), Sotomayor wrote an opinion halting New York City's practice of seizing the motor vehicles of drivers accused of driving while intoxicated and some other crimes and holding those vehicles for "months or even years" during criminal proceedings. Noting the importance of cars to many individuals' livelihoods or daily activities, she held that it violated individuals' due process rights to hold the vehicles without permitting the owners to challenge the City's continued possession of their property.

In Brody v. Village of Port Chester (2003 and 2005), a takings case, Sotomayor first ruled in 2003 for a unanimous panel that a property owner in Port Chester, New York was permitted to challenge the state's Eminent Domain Procedure Law. A district court subsequently rejected the plaintiff's claims and upon appeal the case found itself again with the Second Circuit. In 2005, Sotomayor ruled with a panel majority that the property owner's due process rights had been violated by lack of adequate notice to him of his right to challenge a village order that his land should be used for a redevelopment project. However, the panel supported the village's taking of the property for public use.

In Didden v. Village of Port Chester (2006), an unrelated case brought about by the same town's actions, Sotomayor joined a unanimous panel's summary order to uphold a trial court's dismissal—due to a statute of limitations lapse—of a property owner's objection to his land being condemned for a redevelopment project. The ruling further said that even without the lapse, the owner's petition would be denied due to application of the Supreme Court's recent Kelo v. City of New London ruling. The Second Circuit's reasoning drew criticism from libertarian commentators.

Supreme Court justice

Nomination and confirmation

Following Barack Obama's 2008 presidential election victory, speculation arose that Sotomayor could be a leading candidate for a Supreme Court seat. New York Senators Charles Schumer and Kirsten Gillibrand wrote a joint letter to Obama urging him to appoint Sotomayor, or alternatively Interior Secretary Ken Salazar, to the Supreme Court if a vacancy should arise during his term. The White House first contacted Sotomayor on April 27, 2009, about the possibility of her nomination. On April 30, 2009, Justice David Souter's retirement plans leaked to the media, and Sotomayor received early attention as a possible nominee for Souter's seat to be vacated in June 2009. In May 2009, however, Harvard Law Professor Laurence Tribe urged Obama not to appoint Sotomayor, writing that "she's not nearly as smart as she seems to think she is," and that "her reputation for being something of a bully could well make her liberal impulses backfire and simply add to the fire power of the Roberts/Alito/Scalia/Thomas wing of the court."

On May 25, Obama informed Sotomayor of his choice; she later said, "I had my [hand] over my chest, trying to calm my beating heart, literally." On May 26, 2009, Obama nominated her. She became only the second jurist to be nominated to three different judicial positions by three different presidents. The selection appeared to closely match Obama's presidential campaign promise that he would nominate judges who had "the heart, the empathy, to recognize what it's like to be a teenage mom. The empathy to understand what it's like to be poor, or African-American, or gay, or disabled, or old."

Sotomayor's nomination won praise from Democrats and liberals, and Democrats appeared to have sufficient votes to confirm her. The strongest criticism of her nomination came from conservatives and some Republican senators regarding a line she had used in similar forms in a number of her speeches, particularly in a 2001 Berkeley Law lecture: "I would hope that a wise Latina woman with the richness of her experiences would more often than not reach a better conclusion than a white male who hasn't lived that life." Sotomayor had made similar remarks in other speeches between 1994 and 2003, including one she submitted as part of her confirmation questionnaire for the Court of Appeals in 1998, but they had attracted little attention at the time. The remark now became widely known. The rhetoric quickly became inflamed, with radio commentator Rush Limbaugh and former Republican Speaker of the House of Representatives Newt Gingrich calling Sotomayor a "racist" (although the latter later backtracked from that claim), while John Cornyn and other Republican senators denounced such attacks but said that Sotomayor's approach was troubling. Backers of Sotomayor offered a variety of explanations in defense of the remark, and White House Press Secretary Robert Gibbs stated that Sotomayor's word choice in 2001 had been "poor". Sotomayor subsequently clarified her remark through Senate Judiciary Committee chair Patrick Leahy, saying that while life experience shapes who one is, "ultimately and completely" a judge follows the law regardless of personal background. Of her cases, the Second Circuit rulings in Ricci v. DeStefano received the most attention during the early nomination discussion, motivated by the Republican desire to focus on the reverse racial discrimination aspect of the case. In the midst of her confirmation process the Supreme Court overturned that ruling on June 29. A third line of Republican attack against Sotomayor was based on her ruling in Maloney v. Cuomo and was motivated by gun ownership advocates concerned about her interpretation of Second Amendment rights.  Some of the fervor with which conservatives and Republicans viewed the Sotomayor nomination was due to their grievances over the history of federal judicial nomination battles going back to the 1987 Robert Bork Supreme Court nomination.

A Gallup poll released a week after the nomination showed 54 percent of Americans in favor of Sotomayor's confirmation compared with 28 percent in opposition. A June 12 Fox News poll showed 58 percent of the public disagreeing with her "wise Latina" remark but 67 percent saying the remark should not disqualify her from serving on the Supreme Court. The American Bar Association gave her a unanimous "well qualified" assessment, its highest mark for professional qualification.  Following the Ricci overruling, Rasmussen Reports and CNN/Opinion Research polls showed that the public was now sharply divided, largely along partisan and ideological lines, as to whether Sotomayor should be confirmed.

Sotomayor's confirmation hearings before the Senate Judiciary Committee began on July 13, 2009, during which she backed away from her "wise Latina" remark, declaring it "a rhetorical flourish that fell flat" and stating that "I do not believe that any ethnic, racial or gender group has an advantage in sound judgment."  When Republican senators confronted her regarding other remarks from her past speeches, she pointed to her judicial record and said she had never let her own life experiences or opinions influence her decisions. Republican senators said that while her rulings to this point might be largely traditional, they feared her Supreme Court rulings—where there is more latitude with respect to precedent and interpretation—might be more reflective of her speeches. Sotomayor defended her position in Ricci as following applicable precedent.  When asked whom she admired, she pointed to Justice Benjamin N. Cardozo. In general, Sotomayor followed the hearings formula of recent past nominees by avoiding stating personal positions, declining to take positions on controversial issues likely to come before the Court, agreeing with senators from both parties, and repeatedly affirming that as a justice she would just apply the law.

On July 28, 2009, the Senate Judiciary Committee voted 13–6 in favor of Sotomayor's nomination, sending it to the full Senate for a final confirmation vote. Every Democrat voted in her favor, as did one Republican, Lindsey Graham. On August 6, 2009, Sotomayor was confirmed by the full Senate by a vote of 68–31. All Democrats present, along with the Senate's two Independents plus nine Republicans, voted for her.
 
President Obama commissioned Sotomayor on the day of her confirmation, and her swearing-in ceremony took place on August 8, 2009, at the Supreme Court Building. Chief Justice John Roberts administered the prescribed constitutional and judicial oaths of office, at which time she became the 111th justice (99th associate justice) of the Supreme Court. Sotomayor is the first Hispanic to serve on the Supreme Court, and is one of six women who have served on the Court, along with Sandra Day O'Connor (from 1981 to 2006), Ruth Bader Ginsburg (from 1993 to 2020), Elena Kagan (since 2010), Amy Coney Barrett (since 2020), and Ketanji Brown Jackson (since 2022). Sotomayor's appointment gave the Court a record six Roman Catholic justices serving at the same time.

Justiceship

Sotomayor cast her first vote as an associate Supreme Court justice on August 17, 2009, in a stay of execution case. She was given a warm welcome onto the Court and was formally invested in a September 8 ceremony. Sotomayor's inaugural case in which she heard arguments was on September 9 during a special session, Citizens United v. Federal Election Commission. It involved the controversial aspect of the First Amendment and the rights of corporations in campaign finance; Sotomayor dissented. In her vigorous examination of Floyd Abrams, representing the First Amendment issues in the case, Sotomayor challenged him, questioning 19th century rulings of the Court and saying, "What you are suggesting is that the courts, who created corporations as persons, gave birth to corporations as persons, and there could be an argument made that that was the Court's error to start with ... [imbuing] a creature of State law with human characteristics."

Sotomayor's first major written opinion was a dissent in the Berghuis v. Thompkins case dealing with Miranda rights. As her first year neared completion, Sotomayor said she felt swamped by the intensity and heavy workload of the job. During the oral arguments for National Federation of Independent Business v. Sebelius, Sotomayor showed her increasing familiarity with the Court and its protocols by directing the opening questions of the arguments to Donald Verrilli, the Solicitor General who was representing the government's position.

In succeeding Justice Souter, Sotomayor did not change the Court's net philosophical and ideological balance.  While many cases are decided unanimously or with different voting coalitions, Sotomayor has continued to be a reliable member of the liberal bloc of the court when the justices divide along the commonly perceived ideological lines. Specifically, her voting pattern and judicial philosophy has been in close agreement with that of Justices Breyer, Ginsburg and Kagan. During her first couple of years there, Sotomayor voted with Ginsburg and Breyer 90 percent of the time, one of the highest agreement rates on the Court. In a 2015 article titled "Ranking the Most Liberal Modern Supreme Court Justices", Alex Greer identified Sotomayor as representing a more liberal voting pattern than both Elena Kagan and Ruth Bader Ginsburg. Greer placed Sotomayor as having the most liberal voting history of all the current sitting Justices, and slightly less liberal than her predecessors Thurgood Marshall and John Marshall Harlan II on the Court.

Chief Justice Roberts, together with Justices Kennedy, Thomas, and Alito (and former Justice Scalia) had comprised the identifiable conservative wing of the Court. Although five of the justices on the Supreme Court in 2009 self-identified as having Roman Catholic affiliation, Sotomayor's voting history identifies her singly among them with the liberal bloc of the Court. However, there is a wide divergence among Catholics in general in their approaches to the law.  Due to her upbringing and her past jobs and positions, Sotomayor has brought one of the more diverse sets of life experiences to the Court.

There have been some deviations from the ideological pattern. In a 2013 book on the Roberts Court, author Marcia Coyle assessed Sotomayor's position on the Confrontation Clause of the Sixth Amendment as a strong guarantee of the right of a defendant to confront his or her accusers.  Sotomayor's judicial philosophy on the issue is seen as being in parity with Elena Kagan and, unexpectedly for Sotomayor, also in at least partial agreement with the originalist reading of Antonin Scalia when applied to the clause.

On January 20 and 21, 2013, Sotomayor administered the oath to Vice President Joe Biden for the inauguration of his second term. Sotomayor became the first Hispanic and fourth woman to administer the oath to a president or vice president. On January 20, 2021, Sotomayor administered the oath of office to Kamala Harris for her inauguration as vice president, the first woman to ever hold the office.

By the end of her fifth year on the Court, Sotomayor had become especially visible in oral arguments and in passionate dissents from various majority rulings, especially those involving issues of race, gender and ethnic identity. Sotomayor has shown her individuality on the Court in a number of decisions. In her reading of the constitutionality of the Obama health care law favoring the poor and disabled, she sided with Ginsburg against fellow liberals Breyer and Kagan. In dealing with the Chief Justice, Sotomayor had no difficulty in responding to his statement that "the way to stop discrimination on the basis of race is to stop discriminating on the basis of race," by stating, "I don't borrow Chief Justice Roberts's description of what color-blindness is... Our society is too complex to use that kind of analysis." In the manufacturer liability case of Williamson v. Mazda, which the Court decided unanimously, she wrote a separate concurring opinion. Sotomayor's rapport with her clerks is seen as more formalistic than some of the other justices as she requires detailed and rigorous evaluations of cases she is considering with a table of contents attached. When compared to Kagan directly, one of their colleagues stated, "Neither of them is a shrinking violet". Coyle, in her 2013 book on the Roberts Court, stated that: "Both women are more vocal during arguments than the justices whom they succeeded, and they have energized the moderate-liberal side of the bench."

During her tenure on the Court, Sotomayor has also become recognizable as being among the Court's strongest voices in supporting the rights of the accused.  She has been identified by Laurence Tribe as the foremost voice on the Court calling for reforming criminal justice adjudication—in particular as it relates misconduct by police and prosecutors, abuses in prisons, concerns about how the death penalty is used, and the potential for loss of privacy—and Tribe has compared her will to reform in general to that of past Chief Justice Earl Warren.

In January 2019, Bonnie Kristian of The Week wrote that an "unexpected civil libertarian alliance" was developing between Sotomayor and Neil Gorsuch "in defense of robust due process rights and skepticism of law enforcement overreach."

Notable rulings

Miranda warnings

In 2011, Sotomayor wrote the majority opinion in J.D.B. v. North Carolina, in which the Supreme Court held that age is relevant when determining when a person is in police custody for Miranda purposes. J.D.B. was a 13-year-old student enrolled in special education classes whom police had suspected of committing two robberies. A police investigator visited J.D.B. at school, where he was interrogated by the investigator, a uniformed police officer, and school officials. J.D.B. subsequently confessed to his crimes and was convicted. J.D.B. was not given a Miranda warning during the interrogation, nor an opportunity to contact his legal guardian. In determining that a child's age properly informs the Miranda custody analysis, Sotomayor wrote that "to hold... that a child's age is never relevant to whether a suspect has been taken into custody— and thus to ignore the very real differences between children and adults—would be to deny children the full scope of the procedural safeguards that Miranda guarantees to adults". Sotomayor's opinion cited the Court's earlier decisions in Stansbury v. California (holding that a child's age "would have affected how a reasonable person" would "perceive his or her freedom to leave") and Yarborough v. Alvarado (holding that a child's age "generates commonsense conclusions about behavior and perception"). Sotomayor also pointed out that the law recognizes that a child's judgment is not the same as an adult's, in the form of legal disqualifications on children as a class (e.g., limitations on a child's ability to marry without parental consent). Associate Justice Samuel Alito, jointed by three other justices, wrote a dissenting opinion.

Stolen Valor Act

In United States v. Alvarez (2012), the Court struck down the Stolen Valor Act (a federal law that criminalized false statements about having received a military medal) on First Amendment grounds. While a 6–3 majority of the Court agreed that the law was an unconstitutional violation of the Free Speech Clause, it could not agree on a single rationale. Sotomayor was among four justices, along with Justices Roberts, Ginsburg and Kennedy, who concluded that a statement's falsity is not enough, by itself, to exclude speech from First Amendment protection. Justices Breyer and Kagan concluded that while false statements were entitled to some protection, the act was invalid because it could have achieved its objectives in less restrictive ways. Justices Scalia, Thomas and Alito dissented.

Affordable Care Act

In National Federation of Independent Business v. Sebelius (2012), Sotomayor was part of a 5–4 majority that upheld most of the provisions of the Patient Protection and Affordable Care Act (while being part of a dissent against the reliance upon the Constitution's Taxing and Spending Clause rather than Commerce Clause in arriving at the support). Legal writer Jeffrey Toobin wrote, "Sotomayor's concerns tended toward the earthbound and practical. Sometimes, during oral arguments, she would go on tangents involving detailed questions about the facts of cases that would leave her colleagues stupefied, sinking into their chairs. This time, though, she had a simple line of inquiry. States require individuals to buy automobile insurance (implicitly suggesting the unavoidable comparison to health insurance and the fairness of applying the same principle to health insurance as well)." Sotomayor concluded with the incisive rhetorical flourish in the Court directed at the attorneys: "Do you think that if some states decided not to impose an insurance requirement that the federal government would be without power to legislate and require every individual to buy car insurance?" For Toobin, this distinction drawn by Sotomayor was the heart of the argument for the case in which she was part of the prevailing majority opinion.

In 2014, Sotomayor dissented from a 6–3 ruling that granted Wheaton College of Illinois, a religiously affiliated university, an exemption from complying with the Affordable Care Act (ACA)'s mandate on contraception. The ruling, which came the immediate wake of the Court's 5–4 decision in Burwell v. Hobby Lobby, in which the conservative bloc had prevailed, was opposed by the court's three female members: Sotomayor, Ginsburg and Kagan.  Writing in dissent, Sotomayor wrote that the case was at odds with the majority's previous statements in Hobby Lobby and said,  "Those who are bound by our decisions usually believe they can take us at our word ... Not today." Sotomayor stated further her opinion that the decision risked depriving "hundreds of Wheaton's employees and students of their legal entitlement to contraceptive coverage."

Immigration

Sotomayor was part of a 5–3 majority in Arizona v. United States (2012), that struck down several aspects of the Arizona SB 1070 anti-illegal immigration law.

Fourth Amendment, privacy rights, & qualified immunity

On the Court, Sotomayor has taken positions in favor of an expansive view of the Fourth Amendment protections relating to privacy rights and search and seizure. In United States v. Jones (2012), all nine justices agreed that a warrant was likely to be required before police could place a GPS tracking device on a suspect's car. Most justices sided with a narrow opinion written by Justice Samuel Alito, but Sotomayor (in a lone concurrence) advocated a more expansive view of privacy rights in a digital age, calling for a re-assessment of the longstanding third-party doctrine: "It may be necessary to reconsider the premise that an individual has no reasonable expectation of privacy in information voluntarily disclosed to third parties." The following year, federal judge Richard J. Leon cited this concurrence in his ruling that the National Security Agency's bulk collection of Americans' telephony records likely violated the Fourth Amendment.  Law professors Adam Winkler and Laurence Tribe were among those who said that Sotomayor's Jones concurrence had been influential in calling out the need for a new basis in understanding privacy requirements in a world, as she wrote, "in which people reveal a great deal of information about themselves to third parties in the course of carrying out mundane tasks."

In Missouri v. McNeely (2013), Sotomayor wrote the majority opinion holding that a warrant is required before police take a nonconsensual blood test of a motorist suspected of drunk driving. In Navarette v. California (2014), Sotomayor joined Justice Scalia's dissent from an opinion finding no Fourth Amendment violation from a traffic stop and drug seizure based solely on an anonymous tip submitted to 9-1-1. Sotomayor was the lone dissenter in Mullenix v. Luna (2015), a case in which the Court held, per curiam, that an officer who fired six shots at a fleeing fugitive in a high-speed car chase was entitled to qualified immunity; Sotomayor argued that "By sanctioning a 'shoot first, think later' approach to policing, the Court renders the protections of the Fourth Amendment hollow."

In Utah v. Strieff, a case involving the exclusionary rule, Sotomayor wrote a dissent from the Court's ruling that evidence obtained as a result of an illegal police stop could be admitted if the stopped person was later found to have an outstanding traffic warrant,  writing that it was a "remarkable proposition" that the existence of a warrant could justify a stop illegally based on police officers' "whim or hunch". Echoing her earlier dissent in Heien v. North Carolina (2014), and citing the works of figures such as W. E. B. Du Bois, James Baldwin, and Ta-Nehisi Coates, Sotomayor wrote that Strieff and other Supreme Court Fourth Amendment jurisprudence sent the message "that you are not the citizen of a democracy but the subject of a carceral state, just waiting to be catalogued."

Environmental law

Sotomayor was the sole dissenter in BP P.L.C. v. Mayor and City Council of Baltimore (2021), a case that made it harder for cities and states to win lawsuits against polluters.

Abortion

In Whole Woman's Health v. Jackson (2021), a case regarding an abortion law in Texas that allows private citizens to sue abortion providers, Sotomayor wrote a sharp dissenting opinion, joined by justices Breyer and Kagan. By a 5–4 vote, the Supreme Court allowed the Texas law to stay in effect. Sotomayor concluded that "Today's fractured Court evinces no such courage. While the Court properly holds that this suit may proceed against the licensing officials, it errs gravely in foreclosing relief against state-court officials and the state attorney general. By so doing, the Court leaves all manner of constitutional rights more vulnerable than ever before, to the great detriment of our Constitution and our Republic."

Other activities

Sotomayor was an adjunct professor at New York University School of Law from 1998 to 2007. There she taught trial and appellate advocacy as well as a federal appellate court seminar. Beginning in 1999, she was also a lecturer in law at Columbia Law School in a paying, adjunct faculty position. While there she created and co-taught a class called the Federal Appellate Externship each semester from 2000 until her departure; it combined classroom, moot court, and Second Circuit chambers work. She became a member of the Board of Trustees of Princeton University in 2006, concluding her term in 2011. In 2008, Sotomayor became a member of the Belizean Grove, an invitation-only women's group modeled after the men's Bohemian Grove. On June 19, 2009, Sotomayor resigned from the Belizean Grove after Republican politicians voiced concerns over the group's membership policy.

Sotomayor has maintained a public presence, mostly through making speeches, since joining the federal judiciary and throughout her time on the Supreme Court. She gave over 180 speeches between 1993 and 2009, about half of which either focused on issues of ethnicity or gender or were delivered to minority or women's groups. While on the Supreme Court she has been invited to give commencement addresses at a number of universities including New York University (2012), Yale University (2013), and the University of Puerto Rico (2014). Her speeches have tended to give a more defined picture of her worldview than her rulings on the bench. The themes of her speeches have often focused on ethnic identity and experience, the need for diversity, and America's struggle with the implications of its diverse makeup. She has also presented her career achievements as an example of the success of affirmative action policies in university admissions, saying "I am the perfect affirmative action baby" in regard to her belief that her admission test scores were not comparable to those of her classmates. During 2012 while already on the Supreme Court, Sotomayor made two appearances as herself on the children's television program Sesame Street, explaining what a vocational career is in general and then demonstrating how a judge hears a case.

In July 2010, Sotomayor signed a contract with Alfred A. Knopf to publish a memoir about the early part of her life. She received an advance of nearly $1.2 million for the work, which was published in January 2013 and titled My Beloved World (Mi mundo adorado in the simultaneously published Spanish edition). It focuses on her life up to 1992, with recollections of growing up in housing projects in New York and descriptions of the challenges she faced. It received good reviews, with Michiko Kakutani of The New York Times describing it as "a compelling and powerfully written memoir about identity and coming of age. ... It's an eloquent and affecting testament to the triumph of brains and hard work over circumstance, of a childhood dream realized through extraordinary will and dedication." She staged a book tour to promote the work, and it debuted atop the New York Times Best Seller List.

In 2020, Justice Sotomayor was reportedly targeted by the same gunman, an angry lawyer, who entered U.S. District Court Judge Esther Salas's home, shooting her husband and killing her son. The gunman had subsequently killed himself, after which his detailed planning notes regarding Sotomayor were found.

In January 2021, Sonia Sotomayor swore in Kamala Harris as the Vice President of the United States. It was considered historic as Sotomayor is the first Woman of Color to serve on the Supreme Court and Harris is the first Woman, African-American, and Asian American Vice President.

Awards and honors

Sotomayor has received honorary law degrees from Lehman College (1999), Princeton University (2001), Brooklyn Law School (2001), Pace University School of Law (2003), Hofstra University (2006), Northeastern University School of Law (2007), Howard University (2010), St. Lawrence University (2010), Paris Nanterre University (2010), New York University (2012), Yale University (2013), and the University of Puerto Rico at Río Piedras (2014).

She was elected a member of the American Philosophical Society in 2002.  She was given the Outstanding Latino Professional Award in 2006 by the Latino/a Law Students Association. In 2008, Esquire magazine included Sotomayor on its list of "The 75 Most Influential People of the 21st Century". In 2013, Sotomayor won the Woodrow Wilson Award at her alma mater Princeton University.

In June 2010, the Bronxdale Houses development, where Sotomayor grew up, was renamed after her. The Justice Sonia Sotomayor Houses and Justice Sonia Sotomayor Community Center comprise 28 buildings with some 3,500 residents. While many New York housing developments are named after well-known people, this was only the second to be named after a former resident.  In 2011, the Sonia M. Sotomayor Learning Academies, a public high school complex in Los Angeles, was named after her.

In 2013, a painting featuring her, Sandra Day O'Connor, Ruth Bader Ginsburg, and Elena Kagan was unveiled at the Smithsonian's National Portrait Gallery in Washington, D.C.

In May 2015 she received the Katharine Hepburn medal from Bryn Mawr College.

In 2019, she was inducted into the National Women's Hall of Fame.

Publications

Books 
 Sotomayor, Sonia (2022) Just Help! How to Build a Better World. New York: Penguin Random House. ISBN 9780593206263.
 Sotomayor, Sonia (2019). Just Ask! Be Different, Be Brave, Be You. New York: Penguin Random House. ISBN 9780525514121.
 Sotomayor, Sonia (2019). The Beloved World of Sonia Sotomayor. New York: Penguin Random House. ISBN 9781524771171.

Articles

Forewords

Speeches

See also

 Barack Obama Supreme Court candidates
 Bill Clinton judicial appointment controversies
 Demographics of the Supreme Court of the United States
 George W. Bush judicial appointment controversies
 History of women in Puerto Rico
 List of Puerto Ricans
 List of justices of the Supreme Court of the United States
 List of law clerks of the Supreme Court of the United States (Seat 3)
 List of Roman Catholic United States Supreme Court justices
 List of United States Supreme Court justices by time in office
 Nuyorican
 Puerto Ricans in the United States

Notes

References

Bibliography

External links

 
 
 Sonia Sotomayor Photo Gallery from The White House website
 
  materials given to Senate Judiciary Committee
 CV  from Pace University 2003 Commencement
 
 Supreme Court Associate Justice Nomination Hearings on Sonia Maria Sotomayor in July 2009 United States Government Publishing Office
 Sonya Sotomayor Digital Collection at the Bill Clinton Library
 The NewsHour With Jim Lehrer : WETA 2009-08-06, National Records and Archives Administration, American Archive of Public Broadcasting

|-

|-

|-

20th-century American judges
21st-century American judges
American women legal scholars
American people of Puerto Rican descent
Catholics from New York (state)
Columbia University faculty
Constitutional court women judges
Hispanic and Latino American judges
Judges of the United States Court of Appeals for the Second Circuit
Judges of the United States District Court for the Southern District of New York
Living people
New York (state) Democrats
New York (state) Independents
New York (state) lawyers
New York County Assistant District Attorneys
New York University faculty
People from the Bronx
People with type 1 diabetes
Princeton University alumni
United States court of appeals judges appointed by Bill Clinton
United States district court judges appointed by George H. W. Bush
United States federal judges appointed by Barack Obama
Justices of the Supreme Court of the United States
Current Justices of the Supreme Court of the United States
Yale Law School alumni
Cardinal Spellman High School (New York City) alumni
People from Cleveland Park
People from Greenwich Village
20th-century American women judges
21st-century American women judges
1954 births